Phaeosoma is a genus of picture-winged flies in the family Ulidiidae.

Species
Phaeosoma atricorne (Mik, 1885)
Phaeosoma griseicolle (Becker, 1907)
Phaeosoma mongolicum Soós, 1971
Phaeosoma nigricorne Becker, 1907
Phaeosoma obscuricorne (Becker, 1907)

References

Ulidiidae